Neil Mandt is an American producer of The Golden Globe Awards, director and technology entrepreneur. He started becoming involved in film and TV in the 1990s. He has written, directed, produced, and acted in many different films and TV shows. Mandt has received 10 Emmy nominations and has won 5 Emmy Awards.

Early life
At the age of 20, Mandt was a winner of a College Emmy Award and then subsequently landed a job as the Entertainment Reporter at WDIV-TV4, the NBC affiliate in Detroit.

Television and film
At 24, after being born in Czechoslovakia, Mandt moved to Los Angeles, where he became a field producer for ABC News; one of his first assignments was to  produce ABC's coverage of the O.J. Simpson criminal trial. In November 1995, Mandt made the move to movies: he wrote, produced, directed, and starred in feature film, Hijacking Hollywood, starring Henry Thomas and Scott Thompson.

Mandt spent the rest of the 1990s directing two movies The Million Dollar Kid and Arthur's Quest before returning to television. Mandt then worked for NBC as a producer for its coverage of the 2000 Summer Olympics; his work earned him an Emmy Award from the National Academy of Television Arts and Sciences.  The following spring Mandt partnered with his brother Michael Mandt, creating Mandt Bros. Productions. Within weeks of creating the company the two sold two different series to ESPN; Reel Classics Uncut and the network's first reality show Beg, Borrow & Deal.

In 2003 the Mandt Brothers created the ESPN show "Jim Rome is Burning" starring sports radio superstar Jim Rome; in 2004 they created the series "My Crazy Life" for E! Entertainment Television and in 2007 they created Destination Truth for the Sci Fi Channel.

In 2006 Mandt returned to feature films when he wrote, directed, produced and starred in the indie flick, Last Stop for Paul. It won a top award, Best Picture or Best Screenplay, at 50 plus festivals it screened at in 2006 and 2007. Mandt created a separate internet version of the movie as a series of webisodes housed on the film's website www.laststopforpaul.com as well as Revver and Ifilm. Last Stop for Paul was released theatrically in North America on March 3 of 2008, making it the first internet web series ever to go from the web to the theaters.

In 2007 Mandt produced and directed the web series Tim’s Dates, which went on to be nominated for a Daytime Emmy Award.

In 2009 Mandt and his brother Michael created the television show Sports Jobs with Junior Seau for the Versus Network. Ten episodes of season one were produced and aired in 2009 and 2010, each following Seau performing a variety of behind the scenes sports jobs.

In 2010 Mandt wrote, directed, produced and starred in a TV series for Showtime called Next Stop for Charlie, which was based on his feature film Last Stop for Paul. Later that same year Mandt sold the TV series Ice Brigade, a docu-soap about an ice sculpting company to the Food Network and also an all encompassing car show to Speed Channel. The Car Show, as it's called, stars Adam Carolla, Dan Neil, Matt Farah and John Salley and premiered in the summer of 2011 on Speed.

In February 2011 Mandt sold a pilot to the Fuel Network that will star the BMX riders Zachary Alexander Yankush aka Catfish and Mike Escamilla aka Rooftop as they travel around the world joining the wildest clubs and organizations. The show received a 13 episode order and premiered in the Fall of 2011.

Season 2 of Strangers in Danger premiered on July 11, 2012. As for Next Stop for Charlie, Season 2 premiered on Friday, November 30, 2012 at 12:30am on Showtime and aired each week at the same time for 9 weeks, which marked the ending of the series.

In June 2011, Mandt and his brother entered into a partnership agreement with Ranik Ultimate Fighting Federation China, the only government sanctioned MMA League in China. Neil oversaw financing, creative strategy and content production for live events and multiple TV series in English and Chinese languages. Ruff crowned the only national MMA champions in the history of China.

In the Spring of 2012 the Mandt brothers became co-producers of Million Dollar Arm, In 2008, multi Emmy Award-winning television sports producers, Neil & Michael Mandt began documenting the training and try outs that Singh and Patel were undergoing at the USC campus. Once the boys were signed by the Pirates, Neil Mandt, a feature film director in his own right, viewed the project as a feature film and he and his brother used their production team, and the original footage they had shot, to create a 9-minute trailer for a movie that had yet to be made. In December 2008, the Mandt brothers joined forces with seasoned movie producers Mark Ciardi, Gordon Gray and Joe Roth to shop the project. In early 2009, the screen rights to Singh and Patel's life story were purchased by Sony Pictures Entertainment for development at Columbia Pictures.[9] Sony hired Mitch Glazer to write the screenplay.[10] The film is scheduled for release in May 2014.

In the summer of 2013 the brother's second reality series with the Food Network went into production.  The Shed followed the Orrison BBQ family in Mississippi, as they brought their fun brand of family hijinks to TV.

Based on the huge success of the movie Frozen, Neil and his brother were contracted by Disney, in December 2014, to produce the Disney Parks Frozen Christmas Celebration, which aired on Christmas Day on ABC.  The two-hour special featured music performances from Train, Gavin DeGraw, Ariana Grande, Lucy Hale, Sabrina Carpenter, Laura Marano and Tricia Yearwood and was the highest rated Christmas special on ABC since 2008.

In February 2015 Neil and his brother Michael joined with the Oprah Winfrey Network to produce The Black Women in Hollywood Awards Show.  The event was the eighth annual presented by Essence Magazine and was an important stop for celebrities during the pre-Oscar week.  John Legend and Common performed the Oscar Award Winning song Glory the last time before they won their statue at 87th Academy Awards.

At the top of 2016 Neil sold a pilot to the Esquire Network and was contracted by Verizon to be responsible for creating all of the content for Boston baseball legend, Big Papi's brand new mobile channel.  Production began in April and the content is now available on the Verizon Go90 mobile app.  Mandt and his team are set to develop more channels for the network throughout the year.

In Spring 2016, Neil had added another feature film to his credits, when his movie Dog Years, starring Burt Reynolds and Ariel Winter and directed by Adam Rifkin, was greenlit.  The movie centered around an aging movie star coming to terms with the choices he made in life, when he connects with a young girl who is just entering into adulthood and is making all of the wrong decisions. The film's world premiere was at the 2017 Tribeca Film Festival.

In late 2015, Mandt became the CEO and founder of MANDT VR, a Los Angeles-based virtual reality and 360-degree video production company. MANDT VR created over 20 original serialized series for 360-degree video in 2016, and has partnered with PodcastOne, Oklahoma State University, and Disney to create immersive content.

In January 2017, Neil Mandt and MANDT VR, alongside partner PodcastOne, finalized a deal with Forbes to produce 40 episodes of serialized content. Also in January 2017, Neil and MANDT VR formed a partnership with the Pittsburgh Steelers to create a series of videos in which viewers will be immersed in "stories and traditions that provide an all-access pass to one of the best game day experiences in the NFL." In April 2017, Neil and MANDT VR announced a partnership with College Football Playoff to create a series of videos showcasing the 2017 College Football Playoff National Championship.

As the summer of 2017 drew to a close, IndyCar announced that the league would be partnering with MANDT VR to create both AR and VR content for the racing series.

In March 2018, Neil's feature film producing efforts were rewarded with a theatrical release, as his latest efforts hit the big screen. Mandt's collaboration with writer/director Adam Rifkin, on what would be Burt Reynolds last significant starring role in a movie, The Last Movie Star, was picked up for a worldwide release.  The project debuted the previous spring at the Tribeca Film Festival and was subsequently purchased by the indie studio A24 in a bidding war. The movie has since received acclaim. The movie featured the original song "To Get Here," written by 8 time Oscar Nominee Diane Warren and was performed by country legend Willie Nelson.

Later in the spring of 2018 Mandt collected his first Clio Award for the 360° video production of The Road to the Super Bowl, starring the Philadelphia Eagles.  The project gave viewers unprecedented access to the NFL's top team through immersive media.

On the night before the 2018 midterm elections Neil was tasked with executive producing and showrun the star studded Telethon for America event, which was streamed live across social channels for Ellen, Comedy Central, MTV and BET, amongst others. The non-partisan project was backed by Michelle Obama's organization When We All Vote and featured Charlize Theron, Natalie Portman, Jane Fonda, Pete Davidson, Jessica Alba, Dr. Phil, Chelsea Handler, Judd Apatow, Debra Messing, Sean Hayes, Tyler Oakley, Larry King and Amy Schumer, amongst others.  The show was hosted by Ben Gleib and Olivia Munn.

On January 10, 2020 Neil and his wife Lauren Mandt officially released the CrimeDoor App on IOS and Android. CrimeDoor is the only True Crime platform available that offers users the ability to consume more than 500,000 hours of free videos, articles, photos, police reports and podcasts related to real crime stories around the world. The app also features groundbreaking Augmented Reality features that allow a user to open an AR doorway anywhere and then walk directly into a 3-dimensional crime scene. All AR crime scene experiences are accurate, as they are based on the actual photos of that tragedy. On February 26, 2020 CrimeDoor secured the #4 position of all News apps in the App Store.

In January, 2022 Neil produced the Golden Globe Awards, celebrating the best in movies and TV.

References

External links

Living people